Le Tréport is a commune in the Seine-Maritime department in Normandy, France.

Geography

The mouth of the river Bresle meets the English Channel here, in between the high chalk cliffs and the pebbly beach. Le Tréport-Mers station has rail connections to Beauvais. Le Tréport is also a sea-side resort and home to a casino.

History
Le Tréport (the ancient Ulterior Portus) was a port of some note in the Middle Ages and suffered from the English invasions. Louis Philippe I twice received Queen Victoria here in 1843 and 1845.

The casino was built 1896–1897.

The British World War I soldier Arthur Bullock, who was stationed in Le Tréport after the Armistice, was captivated by the town, nestling at the bottom of cliffs which could be ascended by 365 steps or by a cliff railway. Bullock recorded in his memoir, 'The sea floor must have been covered by multicoloured sands, for on a clear day, looking from the cliffs straight down into the sea, it seemed that one was looking at a vast abstract canvas of blues, yellows, reds and greens'. While staying there, Bullock also painted a study of a French fisher girl with a basket on her back.

In World War II the town was liberated by the 3rd Canadian Division on 1 September 1944.

The city was powered by an electric tramway from 1902. The operation of the Eu-Le Tréport-Mers tramway ceased in 1934.
The vocation of Le Tréport as a seaside resort began under the reign of Louis-Philippe, when the family of this sovereign, residing regularly in Eu, inaugurated the fashion for sea bathing. The Parisian upper middle class wasted no time in building villas on the waterfront and lead a social life there until the eve of Second World War. The tramway was installed at this time as a corollary.

The Tréport - Mers railway station, opened on May 12, 1872, gave Parisians access to the seaside resort and stirred its development. We saw travelers getting off a pleasure train, before the First World War.

Most of the villas were destroyed during the military operations of 1944, which explains the presence of typical Reconstruction architecture, particularly by the sea.

A college in Tréport has the name of Rachel-Salmona, in memory of a 10-year-old girl deported in February 1943, suffering the fate of her father Vitali a few months later, in the Auschwitz camp with her sister, her mother and his grandmother, after being interned in Dieppe and the Drancy camp.

The German army fearing during the whole of the Second World War a landing in Normandy, had several galleries drilled into the cliff to build defenses there facing the sea. These galleries, the whole of which bears the name of Kahl- Burg, are accessible and can be visited today.

Peace and reconstruction brought a comeback of popular tourism and beach life.

An oyster bed, where you could taste the seafood at the very exit of the basins, was located at the very end of the pier, just below the cliffs, after the funicular. A picturesque and popular place, the oyster bed closed its doors in the 1970s.

Population

Administration
The current mayor of Le Tréport is Laurent Jacques of the PCF political party. He became 1st vice-mayor following the 2014 municipal elections (2014-2020). He took over as mayor in January 2016 upon the death of his predecessor Alain Longuent (PCF).

Main sights 

 The remains of an eleventh-century abbey.
 The chapel of St. Julien.
 The lighthouse.
 The new funicular, built in 1907-08, and restored in 2006, linking the town with the cliff-tops.
 The church of St. Jacques du Tréport, dating from the fourteenth century.
 Two museums (The Vieux Tréport museum and the Local History museum).

People
Paul Paray, conductor, was born here in 1886.

Miscellaneous
The three towns of Le Tréport, Eu and Mers-les-Bains are known locally as the Three sisters.

Television
Le Tréport was used as the location for the 2014 French police thriller [[Witnesses (TV series)|Witnesses ("Les témoins")]]. The series, which was written by Hervé Hadmar and Marc Herpoux, starred Thierry Lhermitte and Marie Dompnier. Its style and tempo have been compared to Scandinavian noir such as Wallander, The Bridge and The Killing.

It formed the background for François Ozon's 2020 film Summer of 85''.

See also
 Communes of the Seine-Maritime department
 The works of Maxime Real del Sarte

References

External links

 Website of Le Tréport - Eu - Mers 
 Ville du Tréport en photo, musée du Tréport, musée de la poupée contemporaine 

Communes of Seine-Maritime
Seaside resorts in France